Pancalia amurella is a moth in the family Cosmopterigidae. It was described by Reinhard Gaedike in 1967. It is found in the Russian Far East and China.

References

Moths described in 1967
Antequerinae